Himmelberg is a municipality with 2273 inhabitants in the district of Feldkirchen in the Austrian state of Carinthia in Austria.

Geography
Himmelberg lies in the center of Carinthia northwest of Feldkirchen. It lies in the Tiebel valley. The highest point in the municipality is the Hoferalmkopf (el. ca. 1600 ) in the northwest. The lowest point is the Tiebel (el. 625) in the south of the municipality.

Neighboring municipalities

References

Cities and towns in Feldkirchen District